K. Selva Bharathy is an Indian film director and dialogue writer, who works in Tamil cinema. He made his debut with the Tamil film Ninaithen Vandhai (1998) starring Vijay, Rambha and Devayani. He was one time assistant of late director-actor Manivannan.

Filmography

Director

Actor

Lyricist

References 

Indian film directors
Tamil film directors
Tamil screenwriters
Living people
Film directors from Tamil Nadu
20th-century Indian film directors
21st-century Indian film directors
1964 births